The Anigrides were in Greek mythology the nymphs—that is, the potamides—of the river Anigrus in Elis. On the coast of Elis, not far from the mouth of the river, there was a grotto sacred to them near modern Samiko, which was visited by persons afflicted with skin diseases. They were supposedly cured here by prayers and sacrifices to the nymphs, and by bathing in the river. The earliest known attestation of the cult of these nymphs was from the poet Moero in the 3rd century BCE.

The river Anigrus (or Anigros) itself was a small stream in southern Elis that flowed down from Mount Lapithas and the mountains at Minthi to the Ionian Sea. The waters are distinctly sulfuric in character. The river and cave are now part of the thermal springs of Kaiafas.

Notes

References 

 Pausanias, Description of Greece with an English Translation by W.H.S. Jones, Litt.D., and H.A. Ormerod, M.A., in 4 Volumes. Cambridge, MA, Harvard University Press; London, William Heinemann Ltd. 1918. . Online version at the Perseus Digital Library
 Pausanias, Graeciae Descriptio. 3 vols. Leipzig, Teubner. 1903.  Greek text available at the Perseus Digital Library.
 Strabo, The Geography of Strabo. Edition by H.L. Jones. Cambridge, Mass.: Harvard University Press; London: William Heinemann, Ltd. 1924. Online version at the Perseus Digital Library.
 Strabo, Geographica edited by A. Meineke. Leipzig: Teubner. 1877. Greek text available at the Perseus Digital Library.

Potamides

Nymphs